Ninalee Craig (née Allen; November 6, 1927, Indianapolis – May 1, 2018, Toronto) was an American woman known for being the subject of a series of photographs by Ruth Orkin, the most notable of which is American Girl in Italy.

Photographs
In 1951, Ninalee Craig, then using the name "Jinx Allen", went on a six-month tour of Europe. While in Florence, Italy, she met photographer Ruth Orkin and the two became friends. Orkin photographed Craig as she walked around Florence capturing images of her shopping at markets, flirting in cafés, viewing landmarks, and other travel experiences. The most iconic of the photos is known as American Girl in Italy and shows Craig walking down a street being ogled by a group of men.

Many interpret the photograph as one of harassment and chauvinism. In 2014, Craig said: "At no time was I unhappy or harassed in Europe". "[The photograph is] not a symbol of harassment. It's a symbol of a woman having an absolutely wonderful time!" She has also noted that "Italian men are very appreciative, and it's nice to be appreciated. I wasn't the least bit offended."

Later life
After her trip, Craig returned to New York City and worked as a teacher and an ad writer. She was married to an Italian and lived with him in Milan, but later divorced. After returning to New York, she met a Canadian man, married him, and moved to Toronto. She had a large extended family, including 10 grandchildren and seven great-grandchildren.

Death
Craig died on May 1, 2018, at the age of 90.

References

External links
That's me in the picture: Ninalee Craig photographed by Ruth Orkin in Florence in 1951, aged 23, theguardian.com, January 30, 2015.

1927 births
2018 deaths
American female models
Canadian female models
Deaths from lung cancer in Ontario
People from Indianapolis
American expatriates in Italy
American emigrants to Canada
21st-century American women